The Salamonie Dolomite is a geologic formation in Indiana. It preserves fossils dating back to the Silurian period.

See also
 List of fossiliferous stratigraphic units in Indiana

References

 

Silurian Indiana